Corrieri is a surname. Notable people with the surname include:

Giovanni Corrieri (1920–2017), Italian cyclist
Sergio Corrieri (1939–2008), Cuban actor